Magnac-Laval is a commune in the Haute-Vienne department in the Nouvelle-Aquitaine region in west-central France.

Geography
The river Brame flows westward through the middle of the commune and crosses the town.

Inhabitants are known as Magnachons.

History

See also
Communes of the Haute-Vienne department

References

Communes of Haute-Vienne